Allium subhirsutum, the hairy garlic, is a plant species widespread around the Mediterranean region from Spain and the Canary Islands to Turkey and Palestine.

Allium subhirsutum is a perennial herb up to 50 cm tall. Leaves are long, up to 15 mm across, tapering toward the tip, with hairs along the margins (hence the name "hairy garlic"). The umbel contains only a few flowers, white with thin pink midveins.

Uses
Allium subhirsutum is edible and sometimes cultivated in kitchen gardens. Bulbs can be eaten cooked or in salads. There are however a few reports of toxicity when consumed in large quantities.

Subspecies
 Allium subhirsutum subsp. obtusitepalum (Svent.) G.Kunkel  - Alegranza Island in Canary Islands
 Allium subhirsutum subsp. subhirsutum -  from Spain and Morocco to Turkey and Palestine.

formerly included
 Allium subhirsutum var. barcense, now called Allium longanum
 Allium subhirsutum var. canariense, now called Allium subvillosum
 Allium subhirsutum var. glabrum now called Allium neapolitanum
 Allium subhirsutum subsp. graecum, now called Allium trifoliatum
 Allium subhirsutum var. hirsutum, now called Allium trifoliatum
 Allium subhirsutum subsp. permixtum, now called Allium permixtum 
 Allium subhirsutum var. purpurascens, now called Allium subvillosum
 Allium subhirsutum subsp. spathaceum, now called Allium spathaceum 
 Allium subhirsutum subsp. subvillosum, now called Allium subvillosum 
 Allium subhirsutum subsp. trifoliatum, now called Allium trifoliatum 
 Allium subhirsutum var. vernale, now called Allium subvillosum

References 

subhirsutum
Garlic
Plants described in 1753
Taxa named by Carl Linnaeus
Vegetables
Herbs
Root vegetables
Flora of Europe
Flora of North Africa